William Farrell may refer to:

 William Farrell (architect) (died 1851), Irish architect
 William Farrell (diver) (born 1934), American Olympic diver
 William Farrell, Irish-Canadian businessman and a founder of the British Columbia Telephone Company
 Willie Farrell (1928–2010), Irish politician
 Bill Farrell (baseball), baseball player
 Bill Farrell (singer) (1926–2007), American singer in the 1940s–1950s
 Billy Farrell (footballer), League of Ireland player

See also
William Farrell-Skeffington (1742–1815), British soldier